Kippax is a village and civil parish in the City of Leeds metropolitan borough, West Yorkshire, England.  It is situated to the east of the city, near to Garforth and Great Preston.
The Kippax and Methley ward of Leeds City Council was part of the former UK Parliament constituency of Elmet, which became Elmet and Rothwell at the 2010 UK general election. The population of Kippax parish at the 2011 Census was 9,785. Kippax was a separate civil parish, in Tadcaster Rural District, until 1939, when it was annexed to Garforth.  It re-acquired civil parish status and a parish council on 1 April  2004.

History
The name Kippax is of Anglo-Saxon origin and is first attested as Chipesch in the Domesday Book of 1086, and as "Kippeys" in charters from the 1090s to the 1270s, and Kypask and Kypax from the 13th century onwards. The placename seems to be composed of an Anglo-Saxon personal name Cippa (with initial [tʃ-], suggested by the Domesday Book form) or Cyppa (with initial [k-]) + æsc [æʃ] 'ash-tree'. This suggests that the village was first established in a wooded area of ash trees. The pronunciation of the name seems to show Scandinavian influence, perhaps in the change from initial [tʃ-] to [k-], and more clearly in the change of [-æʃ] to [-ask] (and thereafter [-aks]).

Locational surnames such as Kippax developed when former inhabitants of a place moved to another area, usually to seek work, and were best identified by the name of their birthplace. The surname first appears in the late-14th century and other early recordings include: Johannes de Kypax, Johanna Kepas, and Johannes de Kepax, who were all recorded in the Poll Tax Records of Yorkshire in 1379.

The village's historical roots are evidenced by the presence of an originally Anglo-Saxon church which underwent significant modification in Norman times.  Typical Saxon herring-bone masonry can be seen in the church tower. Despite being an administrative centre for hundreds of years, the population remained small and it was mostly agricultural until the late-18th century when coal mining began on a small scale in bell pits. The advent of deeper mining and the discovery of coal seams in Allerton Bywater saw Kippax undergo a rapid expansion into a typical northern mining community in the 19th century.

Exploitation of the coal led to a railway being built between Garforth and Castleford in 1873. It was closed to passengers in 1951. The decline in deep mining saw Allerton Bywater pit close in the 1990s having been in decline since the 1970s.

Kippax adjusted to its new status as a commuter village. Its proximity to the A1/M1/M62 means that many residents now commute to Leeds, Castleford, London, Wakefield or York rather than working locally. Its old identity as a "mining community" lives on with the village's older residents. This identity could be lost if Kippax becomes part of the greater urban sprawl of east Leeds. Housing development between Kippax and its neighbours (Swillington, Garforth, Great Preston, Allerton Bywater) over the last ten years has reduced Kippax's green margins and its village status will soon be questionable. The high street has a mix of independent butchers, grocers and newsagents and a small co-op store.

Sport and notable people
The village is the home of the Kippax Welfare rugby league club. Its first team plays as the Kippax Knights.

Musician Robert Harvey, of the band The Music, is from Kippax.

Gallery

See also
Listed buildings in Kippax, West Yorkshire

References

External links

 Kippax Village
 YEP Kippax Today Community Website
 

Places in Leeds
Civil parishes in West Yorkshire